Eric John Wilson (born February 21, 1970) is an American musician who is best known as the former bassist for Sublime (1988–1996). He was also bassist for Long Beach Dub Allstars (1997–2002), and Long Beach Shortbus, which was composed of several members of Long Beach Dub Allstars and Sublime. Since 2009, Wilson has been the bassist for Sublime with Rome, a musical collaboration between Wilson and singer and guitarist Rome Ramirez.

Musical career

Sublime
Wilson and Bradley Nowell met in 1979 and later started a punk band called Hogan's Heroes, later changing their name to Sloppy Seconds (not to be confused with the Indiana hardcore punk band of the same name). In 1988, Wilson introduced friend Bradley Nowell to his long-time friend Bud Gaugh, and the three of them went on to form Sublime.

After the death of Sublime's lead vocalist Bradley Nowell in 1996, which disbanded Sublime, Wilson temporarily joined up with 1960s style surf rock band Del Noah & the Mt. Ara Ratfinks, with whom he played the stand-up bass.

Long Beach Dub Allstars
At the same time, Wilson and Sublime drummer Bud Gaugh—along with many friends—started to experiment with the unique Sublime sound. They eventually formed many Sublime-related bands, most of whom signed with the Long Beach record label Skunk Records. In 1997, Long Beach Dub Allstars formed and their first album, Right Back (DreamWorks) was released in 1999. Long Beach Dub Allstars second album Wonders of the World (DreamWorks) was released in 2001. However, the band broke up shortly after in 2002.

Long Beach Shortbus
Wilson then joined a band with lead singer of Long Beach Dub Allstars RAS-1 called Long Beach Shortbus. The band later split in October 2007. Wilson currently plays the drums in a psychedelic rock band called StoneWing who went on a 2009 tour of the Midwest and Colorado with Midwest Reggae Rockers Jon Wayne and The Pain out of Minneapolis. Wilson also plays in an  Iggy Pop cover band called The STyMiES.

Sublime with Rome

It was announced in early 2009 that Wilson would be reuniting with Sublime at Cantina Los Tres Hombres in Sparks, Nevada, on February 28 with Bud Gaugh and new frontman and guitarist Rome Ramirez, in place of Bradley Nowell. Following positive response, the band decided to reunite properly in August 2009 for a possible tour and new album. However, not long after the October 2009 performance at Cypress Hill's Smokeout Festival, a Los Angeles judge banned the new lineup from using the Sublime name and the band was forced to change the name. The new lineup of Eric Wilson, Bud Gaugh and Rome Ramirez performed together as Sublime with Rome.  Their debut album, Yours Truly was released on July 12, 2011. In December 2011, Gaugh left Sublime with Rome, reportedly to spend more time with his family.  He was replaced by Josh Freese and the band has continued to tour.

Spray Allen
In the summer of 2019, after performing in the reggae-rock genre for over three decades, Wilson formed a new 4-piece rock band called of Spray Allen. They released their debut single and music video for the song, "Stay Clean" in May 2021. The single was produced by Paul Leary of the Butthole Surfers, along with Stu Brooks from Dub Trio and Gabrial McNair from No Doubt.

This is a rock-outlet for Wilson taking influences from psychedelic rock from Pink Floyd and Led Zeppelin with Jim Morrison's style vocals into a modern-day sound, they call "new psychedelic", a blend of old and new coming from the 70s, 80s and 90s. Spray Allen consists of Daniel Lonner on vocals, Eric Sherman on guitar, Wade Youman (Unwritten Law) on Drums, and Wilson himself on bass.

Personal life
On April 2, 2019, Wilson broke his arm and four ribs in an ATV accident on his avocado ranch in California. Days after, he was reported to be in stable condition at a San Diego hospital.

Discography

Sublime
40 Oz. to Freedom (1992)
Robbin' the Hood (1994)
Sublime (1996)
Second-hand Smoke (1997)

Del Noah & the Mt. Ararat Finks
Blower Explosion (1998)

Long Beach Dub All-Stars
Right Back (1999)
Wonders of the World (2001)

Long Beach Shortbus
Flying Ship of Fantasy (2004)

Sublime With Rome
Yours Truly (2011)
Sirens (2015)
Blessings (2019)

References

External links
Sublime Official Website

1970 births
American rock bass guitarists
American male bass guitarists
Living people
Musicians from Long Beach, California
American punk rock musicians
Sublime (band) members
American male guitarists
Guitarists from California
21st-century American bass guitarists
Long Beach Dub Allstars members
Long Beach Shortbus members
Sublime with Rome members